Steffon Walby (born November 22, 1972) is an American retired ice hockey player and coach.

Walby was the first head coach of the Mississippi Surge of the Southern Professional Hockey League (SPHL) and was selected as the  2009–10 SPHL Coach of the Year in his inaugural season. The following year, he coached the Surge to capture the  2010–11 SPHL championship. Prior to the start of the next season, the new owner of the team fired Walby from his post as the team's head coach.

Awards and honors

References

External links

1972 births
Living people
Sportspeople from Madison, Wisconsin
Ice hockey coaches from Wisconsin
American ice hockey coaches
Fort Wayne Komets players
Hershey Bears players
Kentucky Thoroughblades players
Madison Capitols players
Mississippi Sea Wolves players
Rochester Americans players
St. John's Maple Leafs players
American men's ice hockey right wingers
Ice hockey players from Wisconsin